Guns, God and Government was a worldwide arena tour by American rock band Marilyn Manson. It was the eighth tour the band embarked upon and the fourth to span over multiple legs. It was launched 17 days ahead in support of their fourth full-length studio album, Holy Wood (In the Shadow of the Valley of Death), which was released on November 14, 2000, in the US and Australia. Beginning on October 27, 2000, and lasting until September 2, 2001, the tour included six legs spanning Eurasia, Japan and North America with a total of 107 completed shows out of 109 planned.

The show began in Minneapolis' Orpheum Theatre. The shows drew numerous protesters and resistance from civic and church leaders as well as other elements of local communities. The contentious Denver show, during the Ozzfest leg of the Guns, God and Government Tour, was also featured during Marilyn Manson's interview in Michael Moore's 2002 documentary film Bowling for Columbine.

Performance and show themes
Typical of the band, the concerts were extremely theatrical. An average show lasted for 1 hour and 40 minutes and the sets were designed with Cold War, religious and "Celebritarian" imagery in mind.

Manson has several costume changes throughout the sets ranging from a Bishop's dalmatic and mitre (often confused for Papal regalia), a costume made from taxidermied animal anatomies (i.e. an epaulette made from a horse's tail, a shirt made from skinned goat heads and ostrich spines), an elaborate Roman legionary-style Imperial galea, an Allgemeine SS-style peaked police cap, his signature black leather corset, g-string and garter stocking ensemble, a black-and-white fur coat and a giant rising conical skirt that lifts the singer 12 meters (40 feet) into the air.

When being introduced, Manson was pulled onstage on a steampunk variation of a Roman chariot by two naked girls, in a bigae formation, wearing stylized Roman horse masks. After dismounting from the chariot wearing a skirted version of his signature black leather bondage ensemble, replete with the Imperial gallic, a burst of heavy fireworks would signal the beginning of the first song.

During performances of "The Love Song", Manson would wear the Bishop's outfit, which would then be discarded to reveal his signature black leather bondage ensemble. During performances of "Valentine's Day", Manson would perform, wearing the same Bishop's attire, kneeled behind a prayer kneeler that is bookended with two severed heads bearing his own likeness.

During some shows, there would be two dancers onstage. The podium that was used in previous tours during performances of "Antichrist Superstar" also returned, this time sporting a new design of a crucifix made of guns, instead of the lightning bolt symbol previously used. During the February 24, 2001 show in Moscow, Russia, two Russian military guards were asked to stand on each side of the podium as Manson sang "The Love Song", replete with his Allgemeine SS-style peaked police cap.

In performances of "Cruci-Fiction in Space", Manson would be lifted 12 meters (40 feet) into the air on a platform hidden by the giant conical skirt, much like in the "Disposable Teens" video. Images would often be displayed in the stage backdrop, including a parody of the Hollywood Sign rewritten as "Holy Wood", the cover for the "Disposable Teens" single, and a scorched American flag.

Incidents
The inaugural North American leg of the Guns, God and Government Tour suffered two separate cancellations. On November 25, 2000, during the band's performance at the Hammerstein Ballroom in New York City, Marilyn Manson drummer Ginger Fish suffered a broken collarbone after falling from his drum riser during the band's stage-trashing finale. The drummer was escorted to hospital by the band's manager where he was treated and released. According to an Interscope spokesperson, the band is not expected to miss any dates due to the injury and that Fish will play with his injured arm in a sling. However, on December 5, 2000, the band cancelled their scheduled performance, at the Toledo Sports Arena in Toledo, Ohio, ten minutes before the doors opened due to Fish reaggravating his injured collarbone.

Protests and controversy
On November 19, 2000, Christian activists unsuccessfully attempted to have the band's performance at the Blue Cross Arena in Rochester, New York cancelled. Thus, the show was attended by demonstrators who harassed concert-goers waiting in line by shouting and chanting "Why do you follow the devil?" The city was forced to send a number of policemen, some on horseback, to monitor the situation. Clips from the show were made available on the band's official website (though it is no longer present).

Marilyn Manson's performance in Denver, Colorado on June 22, 2001, at the Mile High Stadium also drew attention from the national news media. The event was part of their commitments with the heavy metal festival tour Ozzfest and marked the band's first performance in the state since the Columbine High School massacre in nearby Littleton, Colorado on April 20, 1999. The band was initially blamed for inciting shooters Eric Harris and Dylan Klebold into killing their classmates, though these reports would later be proven to be false. The band initially pulled out due to scheduling conflicts, however, the group later altered their plans in order to accommodate the Denver date. The band met heavy resistance from conservative groups and the performer received numerous death threats and calls to skip the date. A group of church leaders and families related to the Columbine tragedy formed an organization specifically to oppose their show called 'Citizens for Peace and Respect', which drew the support of Colorado governor Bill Owens (R-Colo) and representative Tom Tancredo (R-Colo). The group held a rally outside the Mile High Stadium where organizer, youth pastor Jason Janz, delivered a speech stating, "If Marilyn Manson can walk into our town, promote hate, violence, suicide, death, drug use and Columbine-like behavior, I can say, 'Not without a fight you can't.'" Janz further said, "We don't think Manson caused Columbine, but he encourages and legitimizes Columbine-like behavior." Marilyn Manson responded to the assertions of 'Citizens for Peace and Respect' by issuing a statement saying,

A group of Marilyn Manson supporters also responded to 'Citizens for Peace and Respect' by forming an organization called 'Citizens for the Protection of the Right to Free Speech'. The group held a rally in front of the Colorado State Capitol where organizer Carrieanne Andrews, a mother of three, stated that "We just wanted to show that Jason Janz does not speak for our entire community" and that they resented "being told how to be good parents." The Denver show would later provide the backdrop for Manson's landmark interview on America's climate of fear and culture of gun violence in Michael Moore's 2002 documentary Bowling for Columbine. When Moore asked what he would have said if he had the opportunity to speak to the students at Columbine, he replied, "I wouldn't say a single word. I would listen to what they have to say and that's what no one did."

Another incident took place leading up to The Gig On The Green festival on August 25, 2001, in Glasgow, Scotland. Members of the Glasgow community were calling for Marilyn Manson's performance at the festival to be boycotted. Beth Nimmo, the mother of the Columbine killer's first victim, Rachel Scott, joined in the protests and told Scottish tabloid newspaper Daily Record on August 8, 2001, "I don't doubt that his kind of music definitely affects young people and can desensitize them. People need to be strong enough not to listen to it. There is nothing entertaining about real violence. It has real consequences and brings nothing but destruction and pain." In a separate incident, a Catholic Charismatic Renewal group protested in early August 2001 at the Glasgow city centre, where the Glasgow City Council were deciding on the final licensing application for Gig On The Green. This was due to the inclusion of both Eminem and Marilyn Manson on the bill. Both attempts failed.

Lawsuits
In a civil battery suit, David Diaz, a security officer from a concert in Minneapolis, on October 27, 2000, sued for $75,000 in a Minneapolis federal court. The federal court jury found in Manson's favor.

In a civil suit presented by Oakland County, Michigan, Manson was charged with sexual misconduct against another security officer, Joshua Keasler, during a concert in Clarkston, Michigan, on July 30, 2001. Oakland County originally filed assault and battery and criminal sexual misconduct charges, but the judge reduced the latter charge to misdemeanor disorderly conduct. Manson pleaded no contest to the reduced charges, paid a $4,000 fine, and later settled the lawsuit under undisclosed terms.

Arrests
On February 5, 2001, Marilyn Manson was arrested by the Italian police following the band's performance at the Palaghiaccio in Marino, Italy in relation to the controversy surrounding the Milan court case of the stabbing death of a nun by two girls. Following a police raid on the home of the two suspects, Italian police uncovered images of crucifixes, pentagrams and Marilyn Manson lyrics. The band leader, however, was let go due to a lack of evidence that the perpetrators were inspired by the group's music to carry out their actions.

The next day, Manson was arrested again following the group's show at the Palamalaguti in Bologna, Italy. This time, the singer was charged with public indecency relating to the group's June 20, 1999 performance at the Heineken Jammin' Festival in Imola, Italy during their Rock Is Dead Tour two years prior.

Setlist
Though minor changes were made to the setlist throughout the tour, these were the typical setlists for headline shows and festivals (where the band had less time to play) respectively.

Lineup

Marilyn Manson
Marilyn Manson: Vocals
John 5: Guitar
Twiggy Ramirez: Bass
Madonna Wayne Gacy: Keyboards
Ginger Fish: Drums

Supporting acts
 gODHEAD
 The Union Underground
 Cold
 Disturbed
 Professional Murder Music (Portland and Seattle only)

Critical reception

UK magazine Kerrang! praised "[the Guns, God and Government Tour,] honed by the best part of four months playing the enormodromes of America, is the greatest spectacle this side of a New Year's fireworks display [...] this is rock n' roll reinvented as grand theatre." Robert Hilburn of the Los Angeles Times, however, found himself unimpressed with the "tired sound and cheap theatrics" of this tour, commenting, "Manson can go on teasing his fan base with his Grand Guignol circus show, but it's hard to imagine in the age of Eminem and other hard-core rappers that he is still even in the Top 10 on parents' most-feared list. That makes him seem severely dated—and he doesn't do much to correct the impression. For someone with the ambition and possibly the talent to be the new David Bowie, Manson appears resolved to settling for the new Alice Cooper. Manson is a smart, articulate, likable guy. He's too talented to be wasting his time chasing the ghost of Alice Cooper."

Broadcasts & Recordings
Two concert films depicting the worldwide tour were recorded. The Guns, God and Government DVD was released on October 29, 2002, by Eagle Rock Entertainment and features live concert footage culled from performances in Los Angeles, Europe, Russia and Japan. It also includes a 30-minute behind-the-scenes featurette titled The Death Parade with guest appearances from Ozzy Osbourne and Eminem. Seven years later it was followed by Guns, God and Government – Live in L.A. Released in Blu-ray format by Eagle Rock Entertainment division Eagle Records on November 17, 2009, it depicts the sixteen song set of the Los Angeles, but does not include 'The Death Song'.

Tour dates

References

External links
Holy Wars: The Ground Campaign Begins

Marilyn Manson (band) concert tours
2000 concert tours
2001 concert tours